The Johnnie Walker Championship at Gleneagles was a European Tour golf tournament which was played at the Gleneagles Hotel in Scotland. The tournament was founded in 1999 as the Scottish PGA Championship, and despite maintaining the same sponsor, has since changed name on several occasions, as Diageo has looked to promote different brands. It was last contested over the PGA Centenary Course, formerly called the Monarch's Course, venue for the 2014 Ryder Cup matches. It was last played in 2013

The tournament was one of three on the European Tour schedule which always takes place in Scotland, the others being the Scottish Open and the Dunhill Links Championship.

The event is not to be confused with the Johnnie Walker Classic, which is a longer established golf tournament played in the Asia-Pacific region, and co-sanctioned by the European, Australasian and Asian tours.

Winners

External links

Coverage on the European Tour's official site

Former European Tour events
Golf tournaments in Scotland
Defunct golf tournaments
Sport in Perth and Kinross
Diageo
Recurring sporting events established in 1999
Recurring sporting events disestablished in 2013
1999 establishments in Scotland
2013 disestablishments in Scotland